Allium changduense is a plant species native to the Chinese provinces of Sichuan and Xizang (Tibet). It grows at elevations of 3200–4500 m.

Allium changduense has narrow, cylindrical bulbs less than 10 mm across. Scapes are up to 20 cm tall, round in cross-section. Leaves are very narrow, shorter than the scape. Umbels  are small, with reddish-purple flowers.

References

changduense
Onions
Flora of Tibet
Flora of China
Flora of Sichuan
Plants described in 1980